Latham is a small town in the Mid West region of Western Australia. It is named after Latham Rock, a large granite rock close to the townsite. The rock was named for an early pastoralist who established a watering place for stock being droved through the area.

When construction of the railway from Wongan Hills to Mullewa was planned in 1913, the Public Works department decided the area would be suitable as a railway station and a townsite. The railway opened for service in 1915 and the townsite was gazetted in 1917.

The bulk wheat bin was opened in November 1936.

The surrounding areas produce wheat and other cereal crops. The town is a receival site for Cooperative Bulk Handling.

Champion wrestler George Dinnie (1875–1939) was a resident of Latham in the 1920s.

References

External links 

Shire of Perenjori
Grain receival points of Western Australia